Alexis Morvan Rosius (born 17 March 1993), known professionally as Alvan, is a French singer and songwriter. He represented France in the Eurovision Song Contest 2022 together with vocal group Ahez with the song "Fulenn".

Discography

Studio albums 
 Magma (2022)

Extended plays 
 Home (2016)
 La ballade (2017)

Singles

References 

Eurovision Song Contest entrants of 2022
Eurovision Song Contest entrants for France
1993 births
Living people
French electro musicians
Musicians from Rennes
Breton-language singers